Protection is a 2001 thriller film directed by John Flynn. In this movie, a former mobster, now in the Witness Protection Program, finds himself unable to change his ways. Filming took place in Canada. It was Flynn's last movie.

Cast
Stephen Baldwin as Sal (also called Salvatore)
Peter Gallagher as Ted
Aron Tager as Lujak
Katie Griffin as Gina
Deborah Odell as Laura

References

External links

American thriller films
2001 thriller films
Films directed by John Flynn
Films about witness protection
2000s English-language films
2000s American films